Freak City Soundtrack is the third studio album by Material Issue, released on Mercury Records in 1994. It was the last studio album the band would record before frontman Jim Ellison committed suicide in 1996.

Production
The album was produced by Mike Chapman, who also produced breakthrough albums for Blondie and The Knack. Rick Nielsen appears on the album.

Critical reception
Trouser Press called the album "an unqualified triumph," and praised "Help Me Land" as "two minutes of slashing power chords, a frenzied vocal and Zelenko’s totally out-of-control drumming." The Hartford Courant called it "40 minutes of high-energy, minimal-angst-factor fun." The Chicago Tribune called Freak City Soundtrack "a return to form ... It comes as close as any disc to capturing the band's live energy."

Track listing
All songs written by Jim Ellison except when noted. 
"Goin' Through Your Purse" - 3:23
"Kim the Waitress" (Jeff Kelly, Jim Kelly) - 4:57
"Funny Feeling" - 3:25
"The Fan" - 3:05
"One Simple Word" - 2:44
"A Very Good Thing" - 2:42
"I Could Use You" - 4:10
"Ordinary Girl" - 3:11
"Eko Beach" - 2:35
"She's Going Through My Head" - 3:11
"Help Me Land" - 1:53

References

1994 albums
Mercury Records albums
Material Issue albums